Center Hill is a neighborhood located in northwest Atlanta, Georgia with a population of 4,741. Center Hill is located between Donald L. Hollowell Highway, Hamilton E. Holmes Drive, and Simpson Road. Center Hill is a neighborhood in Atlanta, Georgia. Many retirees live in Center Hill and residents tend to be liberal.

Center Hill Neighborhood Association
Center Hill Neighborhood Association (CHNA) was formed by a coalition of Center Hill neighbors with the goal to engage neighbors and steer development in the community. Center Hill is part of Atlanta's NPU-J.

Schools
Williams Elementary School
Benjamin S. Carson Honors Preparatory School
Douglass High School
Greater Atlanta Adventist Academy

References

Neighborhoods in Atlanta